The Kingdom of Bhirkot was a petty kingdom in the confederation of 24 states known as Chaubisi Rajya. The Kingdom of Gorkha's royal family were related to Kings of Bhirkot by agnatic seniority. During the reign of Mughal emperor Akbar, Bhupal Rana, fled to Bhirkot after he was chased by Muslims.

References 

Chaubisi Rajya
Former countries in South Asia
Bhirkot
History of Nepal
b